Srđan Novković (Serbian Cyrillic: Срђан Новковић; born 29 March 1983) is a Serbian footballer.

He previously played for Italian A.S. Varese 1910, FK Vojvodina, FK Čukarički, FK Napredak Kruševac and PFC Slavia Sofia.

References

1983 births
Living people
Footballers from Belgrade
Serbian footballers
FK Čukarički players
FK Napredak Kruševac players
FK Hajduk Kula players
FK Jagodina players
FK Voždovac players
FK BSK Borča players
FK Sloga Kraljevo players
Serbian SuperLiga players
First Professional Football League (Bulgaria) players
Expatriate footballers in Italy
PFC Slavia Sofia players
Expatriate footballers in Bulgaria
Association football midfielders
Serbian expatriate sportspeople in Bulgaria